Stephen Wayne Ramsey (April 22, 1948 – October 15, 1999) was a professional American football quarterback who played in seven National Football League seasons from 1970-1976 for two different teams, the New Orleans Saints and the Denver Broncos. He was traded to the New York Giants in exchange for Craig Morton in 1977 but was released before the season began.  Ramsey attended W. W. Samuell High School in Dallas, Texas and The University of North Texas in Denton, Texas. He died at age 51 after an accident while trying to drive himself to the hospital after having a heart attack.

See also
 List of NCAA major college football yearly passing leaders

External links 
 

1948 births
1999 deaths
Players of American football from Dallas
American football quarterbacks
North Texas Mean Green football players
New Orleans Saints players
Denver Broncos players